The Philadelphia Phillies are a Major League Baseball team based in Philadelphia, Pennsylvania. They  are a member of the Eastern Division of Major League Baseball's National League. The team has played officially under two names since beginning play in 1883: the current moniker, as well as the "Quakers", which was used in conjunction with "Phillies" during the team's early history. The team was also known unofficially as the "Blue Jays" during the World War II era. Since the franchise's inception,  players have made an appearance in a competitive game for the team, whether as an offensive player (batting and baserunning) or a defensive player (fielding, pitching, or both).

Of those  Phillies, 51 have had surnames beginning with the letter A. Three of those players have been inducted into the Baseball Hall of Fame: pitcher Grover Cleveland Alexander, who played for the Phillies from 1911 to 1917 and again in 1930; second baseman Sparky Anderson, who played for the team in 1959 and was inducted to the Hall of Fame as a manager; and center fielder Richie Ashburn, who was a Phillie from 1948 to 1959. The Hall of Fame lists the Phillies as the primary team for both Alexander and Ashburn, and they are members of the Philadelphia Baseball Wall of Fame, as is Dick Allen. Ashburn's number 1 has been retired by the Phillies, who have also honored Alexander with a representation of the letter "P"; he played before uniform numbers were used in Major League Baseball. Ashburn also holds a franchise record; his 1,811 career singles are best among all of Philadelphia's players.

Among the 34 batters in this list, catcher Hezekiah Allen has the highest batting average: a .667 mark, with two hits in his three plate appearances. Other players with an average above .300 include Bobby Abreu (.303 in nine seasons), Jim Adduci (.368 in one season), Ethan Allen (.316 in three seasons), Stan Andrews (.333 in one season), Joe Antolick (.333 in one season), Buzz Arlett (.313 in one season), and Ashburn (.311 in twelve seasons). Richie Allen's 204 home runs lead Phillies players whose names begin with A, as do Abreu's 814 runs batted in.

Of this list's 17 pitchers, Antonio Alfonseca has the best win–loss record, in terms of winning percentage; his five wins and two losses notched him a .714 win ratio in his one season with the team. Alexander has the most wins (190), losses (91), and strikeouts (1,409), as well as the lowest earned run average (2.18) among qualifying pitchers; the only player to best Alexander in that category on this list is outfielder Mike Anderson, who made one pitching appearance in 1979, throwing one inning and allowing no runs (a 0.00 ERA).

Footnotes
Key
 The National Baseball Hall of Fame and Museum determines which cap a player wears on their plaque, signifying "the team with which he made his most indelible mark". The Hall of Fame considers the player's wishes in making their decision, but the Hall makes the final decision as "it is important that the logo be emblematic of the historical accomplishments of that player’s career".
 Players are listed at a position if they appeared in 30% of their games or more during their Phillies career, as defined by Baseball-Reference. Additional positions may be shown on the Baseball-Reference website by following each player's citation.
 Franchise batting and pitching leaders are drawn from Baseball-Reference. A total of 1,500 plate appearances are needed to qualify for batting records, and 500 innings pitched or 50 decisions are required to qualify for pitching records.
 Statistics are correct as of the end of the 2010 Major League Baseball season.

References
General

Inline citations

A